Colchester Casuals Football Club was an amateur football club based in Colchester, England.

History
Colchester Casuals Football Club history can be traced back to 1883, when the Casuals first appeared in Colchester football records. Colchester Casuals mainly operated as a feeder club for Colchester United.

The 1946–1947 season was their most successful ever when they were winners of the Essex and Suffolk Border League. the British Legion Cup, the Essex and Suffolk Border League Cup and were runners-up in the Clacton Hospital Cup.  In 1948, Colchester Casuals entered the FA Cup for the first time, losing 3–2 away to Dagenham British Legion in the extra preliminary round. The following season, the club reached the preliminary round, after beating Saffron Walden Town 3–2, before exiting to the hands of Grays Athletic. During the 1950s, the club also entered the FA Amateur Cup.

The team at this time contained an array of talent including a young Vic Keeble who went on to play for Newcastle United and they were captained by former Chelsea and Northern Ireland player Cecil Allan.

Colchester Casuals once had a close relationship with Colchester United when Benny Fenton was the manager with several of the Casuals players turning out regularly at Colchester United's Layer Road ground in the Combination League or the Southern Mid-Week Football League.

Other players who came through the Colchester Casuals ranks included:

John Bond who went on to play for West Ham United.
Dave Coleman who went on to play for Colchester United..
Bobby Hunt who went on to play for Colchester United and Ipswich Town.
Mick Loughton who in 1964 went on play for Colchester United.
John "Jack" McClelland who went on to play for Stoke City.
Frank Smith who played in goal for Tottenham Hotspur.

The club folded in 1970 due to financial problems and difficulties raising a full team.

Honours
Essex and Suffolk Border League - Division II Junior
 Winners 1896-1897 season
Essex and Suffolk Border League - Premier Division 
 Champions 1946–1947 season
British Legion Cup
 Winners 1946–1947 season
Essex and Suffolk Border League Cup
 Winners 1946–1947 season
 Winners 1960–1961 season
Clacton Hospital Cup
 Runners-up 1946–1947 season
Whitton Charity Cup
 Runner-up 1946–1947 season
Bromley Cup
 Winners 1949–1950 season

Records
Best FA Cup performance: Preliminary round, 1949–50

References

Colchester United F.C.
Essex and Suffolk Border Football League
Defunct football clubs in Essex
1883 establishments in England
Association football clubs established in 1883
1970 disestablishments in England
Association football clubs disestablished in 1970